Battery No. 5 is a historic artillery battery located at James Island, Charleston, South Carolina. It was built in 1863, as part of the James Island Siege Line. At the close of the war it was armed with four guns. The earthen redoubt's left faces measuring about 200 feet and the center face about 100 feet. It has a 10 foot high parapet wall.

It was listed on the National Register of Historic Places in 1982.

References

Military facilities on the National Register of Historic Places in South Carolina
Military installations established in 1863
Buildings and structures in Charleston County, South Carolina
National Register of Historic Places in Charleston, South Carolina
American Civil War on the National Register of Historic Places